The Chairman of CEC USSR (Holova TsVK USRR) was the speaker of the Central Executive Committee, Ukraine's unicameral parliament. On July 25, 1938 it was replaced with the Chairman of the Verkhovna Rada.

From December 30, 1922 to January 12, 1938 the position was also co-chairman of the Central Executive Committee of the Soviet Union.

List of chairmen
 28 December 1917 - 17 March 1918—Yukhym Medvedev
 25 March 1918 - 18 April 1918 -- Volodymyr Zatonsky
 10 March 1919 - 25 July 1938—Hryhoriy Petrovsky

References

External links
 Высшие органы государственной власти Украинской ССР (Supreme authorities of state power of the Ukrainian SSR)

Politics of Ukraine
Chairmen of the Verkhovna Rada